Ecobrick or Eco-brick may refer to:

Eco-Brick, a brand name concentrated fireplace fuel source made from pressed sawdust, see Firelog
Ecobricks (sometimes known as "Eco-bricks" or "bottle bricks"), plastic bottles stuffed solid with non-biological waste to create reusable building blocks.
Eco Brick, a type of water-permeable paving block, see paver (flooring)